Wilhelm Friedrich Philipp Pfeffer (9 March 1845 – 31 January 1920) was a German botanist and plant physiologist born in Grebenstein.

Academic career 
He studied chemistry and pharmacy at the University of Göttingen, where his instructors included Friedrich Wöhler (1800-1882), William Eduard Weber (1804-1891) and Wilhelm Rudolph Fittig (1835-1910). Afterwards, he furthered his education at the universities of Marburg and Berlin. At Berlin, he studied under Alexander Braun (1805-1877) and was an assistant to Nathanael Pringsheim (1823-1894). Later on, he served as an assistant to Julius von Sachs (1832-1897) at Würzburg, 

In 1873 he was appointed professor of pharmacology and botany at the University of Bonn, followed by professorships at the Universities of Basel (from 1877) and Tübingen (from 1878), where he also served as director of the Botanischer Garten der Universität Tübingen. In 1887 he became a professor at the University of Leipzig and director of its botanical garden.

He was elected a member of the Royal Swedish Academy of Sciences in 1897.

Scientific work 
Pfeffer was a pioneer of modern plant physiology. His scientific interests included the thermonastic and photonastic movements of flowers, the nyctinastic movements of leaves, protoplastic physics and photosynthesis. In 1877, while researching plant metabolism, Pfeffer developed a semi-porous membrane to study the phenomena of osmosis. The eponymous "Pfeffer cell" is named for the osmometric device he constructed for determining the osmotic pressure of a solution.

During his tenure at Leipzig, Pfeffer published an article on the use of photography to study plant growth. He wanted to extend the chronophotographic experiments of Étienne-Jules Marey (1830-1904) by producing a short film involving the stages of plant growth. This "movie" would be filmed over a period of weeks by frame-at-a-time exposure taken at regular spaced intervals. Later, time-lapse photography would become a commonplace procedure.

Written works 
 Physiologische Untersuchungen - 1873 (Physiological studies)
 Lehrbuch der Pflanzenphysiologie (Textbook of plant physiology). 
 Die periodischen Bewegungen der Blattorgane - 1875 (The periodic movements of "leaf organs") 
 Osmotische Untersuchungen – Studien zur Zellmechanik - 1877 (Osmotic studies)
 Beiträge zur Kenntniss der Oxydationsvorgänge in lebenden Zellen - 1889 (Contributions to the knowledge of the oxidative processes in living cells).
 Über Aufnahme und Ausgabe ungelöster Körper - 1890 
 Studien zur Energetik der Pflanze - 1892 (Studies on the energetics of plants)
 Druck- und Arbeitsleistung durch wachsende Pflanzen - 1893 
 Untersuchungen über die Entstehung der Schlafbewegungen der Blattorgane - 1907 
 Der Einfluss von mechanischer Hemmung und von Belastung auf die Schlafbewegung - 1911 (The influence of mechanical stress on the inhibition of sleep and movement). 
 Beiträge zur Kenntniss der Entstehung der Schlafbewegungen- 1915 (Contributions to the knowledge on the genesis of sleep movements).

References 
 List of publications copied from an equivalent article at the German Wikipedia.

1845 births
1920 deaths
People from Grebenstein
19th-century German botanists
University of Göttingen alumni
Academic staff of the University of Bonn
Members of the Royal Swedish Academy of Sciences
Recipients of the Pour le Mérite (civil class)
Fellows of the Royal Society
Foreign associates of the National Academy of Sciences
Academic staff of the University of Tübingen
Academic staff of the University of Basel
Academic staff of Leipzig University
Plant physiologists
People from Mansfeld-Südharz
Members of the Royal Society of Sciences in Uppsala